An SEO contest is a prize activity that challenges search engine optimization (SEO) practitioners to achieve high ranking under major search engines such as Google, Yahoo, and MSN using certain keyword(s). This type of contest is controversial because it often leads to massive amounts of link spamming as participants try to boost the rankings of their pages by any means available. The SEO competitors hold the activity without the promotion of a product or service in mind, or they may organize a contest in order to market something on the Internet. Participants can showcase their skills and potentially discover and share new techniques for promoting websites.

History

The first recorded SEO contest was Schnitzelmitkartoffelsalat by German webmasters, started on November 15, 2002, in the German-language usenet group de.comm.infosystems.www.authoring.misc. In the English-language world, the nigritude ultramarine competition created by DarkBlue.com and run by SearchGuild is widely acclaimed as the mother of all SEO contests. It was started on May 7, 2004, and was won two months later by Anil Dash. On September 1 of the same year, webmasters were challenged to rank number 1 on Google in three months' time for the search phrase seraphim proudleduck.

In the first quarter of 2005, people were competing for the term loquine glupe, spawning web sites ranging from shampoo advertising to holiday resorts. The page that won in the end used many questionable techniques like "keyword stuffing" and "domain age".

Internationally, in 2005, two major contests took place in Europe. In Germany the Hommingberger Gepardenforelle (literally Cheetah Trout of Hommingberg, but neither the fish nor the place actually exist) by the computer magazine c't spawned almost 4 million results; its goal was to find out how search engines rank sites. In Poland almost at same time the Polish SEO community organized the msnbetter thangoogle contest. It topped the 4 million but failed to reach its goal to promote SEO in Poland and to get search engines companies' attention for the Polish market. Some current and pending contests are listed below.

A competition ran from January 1, 2006, to March 1, 2006, and carried the term redscowl bluesingsky, another set of made-up words. It was sponsored by SEOLogs. Shoemoney won this contest, and since he contributed the winner's money, he donated it to the runner-up.

Since then, SEO contests have become a part of some academic classes. In 2008 Luis von Ahn at Carnegie Mellon University created a contest for his students. In 2010 Adam Wierman picked it up at Caltech.

In 2019, the web development company Wix ran an SEO competitions with two SEO agencies trying to rank for the term "Wix SEO", with Marie Haynes Consulting Inc, an SEO agency from Ottawa Canada, winning the $25,000 prize.

Tactics
Some webmasters resort to spam, while others use white-hat optimization techniques, like providing good content covering the competition, or optimizing page titles. Most SEO contests expect people to optimize a single web page for a non-existent phrase of two silly words. This is to keep existing web sites from getting a head start and to make sure that regular internet searchers will not be shown contest pages when searching the web for other information.

Rules and limitations can make it harder to benefit from the ranking algorithm of the targeted search engine. The January 2006 Redscowl Bluesingsky contest issued by seologs.com was open for domains created after the start of the competition only. This meant that the contestants could not benefit from the ranking advantage old web sites have over new ones. Also, it was expected that the Redscowl Bluesingsky game would be won by a domain made up entirely of the search words, such as "redscowl-bluesingsky.com", which would attract natural links and be likely to benefit from the simplicity of the URL.

Another special rule that fits well with the "purpose" of SEO contests today is the obligation to "link back" to the organizing body, often a search engine optimization site. Since a web document's ranking on major search engines like Yahoo!, Google, or MSN Search is mainly determined by internet hyperlinks pointing to that document, forcing webmasters to link to a web site is quite a powerful way to increase its web presence. A good example is the contest announced by V7N (using the phrase v7ndotcom elursrebmem) and its counterpart by WebGuerrilla. While the first of these originally required the contestants to link to V7N forums, the second forbids its players to do just that. Instead, a special link to Google engineer Matt Cutts' blog is imperative. Because of this rivalry, both the rules and prize money on both these SEO contests were updated regularly up until the official start date on January 15, 2006.

Responses
Google's John Mueller has warned people that SEO contests are a waste of time and effort. Mueller says “SEO contests are pretty useless. SEO contests never reflect real life-performance, they generate a ton of spam that negatively affects the whole ecosystem, they’re a big waste of time & effort. The smart approach to SEO contests is to ignore them.” Muller adds that anyone considering participating in an SEO contest should devote their time and effort to something more productive. “If you’re thinking of running or taking part in one, consider just improving your services overall, making the websites you work on stronger & better for the long run, instead of trying to play useless, short-term games.”

See also
 Google bomb
 Spamming

References

Search engine optimization